Boston University Central station is a surface-level light rail station on the MBTA Green Line B branch, located the center median of Commonwealth Avenue west of St. Marys Street in Boston, Massachusetts, surrounded by the Boston University campus. It consists of two side platforms, which serve the B branch's two tracks. 

The station is accessible, with raised platforms to allow level boarding onto low-floor trams and a high platform on the inbound side to serve high-floor trams.

History

The station has the third-highest ridership on the B branch (after only Harvard Avenue and ). In the early 2000s, the MBTA modified key surface stops with raised platforms for accessibility. Portable lifts were installed at Boston University Central around 2000 as a temporary measure. Construction at Boston University Central and Boston University East was part of a $32 million modification of thirteen B, C, and E branch stations.  During construction, an interim station with temporary platforms between the two stops was used. Construction began on March 18, 2002, a week behind schedule due to delays in finishing up similar work at Harvard Avenue and Washington Street. The project was then expected to be completed within six months.

However, poor weather and limited work periods (as most work could only be done during the four hours at night that no trains used the line) delayed the completion date first to December 2002, then March 2003. The contractor informed the MBTA in early 2003 that they would be unable to complete the work; a new contractor was chosen in mid-2003, but work did not resume until September. The stations were completed and reopened on November 18, 2003.

Around 2006, the MBTA added a wooden mini-high platform on the inbound side, allowing level boarding on older Type 7 LRVs. These platforms were installed at eight Green Line stations in 2006–07 as part of the settlement of Joanne Daniels-Finegold, et al. v. MBTA.

Nearby stops were proposed on the Urban Ring – a circumferential bus rapid transit (BRT) line designed to connect the existing radial MBTA rail lines to reduce overcrowding in the downtown stations. Under draft plans released in 2008, the Urban Ring would have run over the Grand Junction Railroad Bridge, on a dedicated busway under the Boston University Bridge, and along University Road and Mountfort Street. A southbound BRT stop would have been located on University Road, with the northbound stop on Mountfort Street near Carlton Street. The project was cancelled in 2010.

Bus connections

Four MBTA bus routes have connections near the station:
: Sullivan Square station–Ruggles station
: Central Square, Cambridge–Broadway station
: –Kenmore station
: –Kenmore station
: Watertown Yard–Haymarket station

Routes CT2 and 47 stop at Commonwealth Avenue at University Road (northbound) and Mountfort Street at Lenox Street (southbound) to the west of the station, and Park Drive at Beacon Street to the south. Routes 57 and 57A (plus the limited-service 193) stop on Commonwealth Avenue at Saint Mary's Street directly across from the station.

References

External links

MBTA – Boston University Central
Saint Mary's Street entrance from Google Maps Street View

Green Line (MBTA) stations
Railway stations in Boston
Railway stations in Massachusetts at university and college campuses
Railway stations in the United States opened in 1894